Chamber of Counties elections were held in Croatia for the first time on 7 February 1993. The result was a victory for the Croatian Democratic Union, which won 37 of the 63 elected seats.

Background
Under the new constitution adopted in 1990, the Croatian Parliament was bicameral. The lower house had been elected in 1992 and its representatives had passed laws creating new territorial organisations of Croatia. This included counties that were to be represented by the upper house – the Chamber of Counties.

Each county elected three members, while the President had the right to appoint five members, known as "Virils". The electoral law made each county a district that was to elect three representatives on the basis of proportional representation.

In practice, the use of proportional representation in such small districts led to a single party – the Croatian Democratic Union – being grossly overrepresented because sometimes even with less than third of the votes guaranteed two of the three seats.

The elections were marked by an uncharacteristically intense campaign directed towards single region – Istria. The government of Franjo Tuđman has invested great effort to defeat the Istrian Democratic Assembly (IDS) after being concerned by the party's good result during the 1992 elections. This effort backfired, resulting in record vote for the IDS.

Results

References

Elections in Croatia
Croatia
Chamber of Counties
Croatia